Paul Carr may refer to:

Paul Carr (actor) (1934–2006), American character actor
Paul Bradley Carr (born 1979), Las Vegas-based British writer, journalist and commentator
Paul Carr (American football) (1931–2006), American football player
Paul Carr (composer) (born 1961), English classical music composer
Paul Carr (Gaelic footballer), played for Donegal
Paul H. Carr (sailor) (1924–1944), U.S. Navy gunner's mate and Silver Star recipient
Paul Carr (musician), English guitarist and member of the James Taylor Quartet
Paul H. Carr (physicist) (born 1935), physicist and researcher
Paul Carr (rugby league) (born 1967), rugby league footballer of the 1990s for Scotland, South Sydney Rabbitohs, and Sheffield Eagles